Marie Heiberg (10 September 1890 – 15 February 1942) was an Estonian poet. When she was only about 15 years old she wrote her first poems which were acclaimed for their youthful freshness. Heiberg spent the last twenty years of her life in a mental institution. There is a memorial to her memory in Urvaste.

Biography
Heiberg was born on Siimu Farm near Lake Uhtjärv in the south of Estonia in September 1890, (though technically her birth occurred in August 1890 as Estonia did not change from the Julian calendar to the Gregorian calendar until 1917). Heiberg was brought up in a poor family environment. After attending local schools in the small village of Urvaste and the larger borough of Sangaste in 1905, Heiberg began to write poetry when she was sixteen.

Her first poems appeared in an anthology published by the Estonian writer and critic Friedebert Tuglas. (She and Tuglas were to exchange letters for the next twelve years.) When she was 16, she went to Tartu where she earned a living performing odd jobs and working as a freelance journalist. In 1906, she published her first collection of poems  (Songs of a Problem Child), followed in 1913 by her second and last collection Luule (Poems). In 1910, she published a short story, Elukevade (Springtime of Life). Her stories are not comparable with her talented approach to poetry with its recurrent themes of loneliness, sadness and spiritual darkness. During all this time she corresponded with Tuglas despite his being in exile in various countries around Europe. He returned to Estonia in 1917.

Around 1919, Heiberg began to suffer from a mental illness, possibly schizophrenia, and spent some time in Tallinn's mental hospital. She returned home but her condition deteriorated with the result that she spent the last 20 years of her life in a mental home until she died in February 1942.

Legacy
In 2010 a book, Üks naine kurbade silmadega, was published about Heiberg, her correspondence and some of her poetry. A memorial to Marie Heiberg which includes a bust of her has been erected beside the church in Urvaste. Heiberg's words inspired Tõnu Kõrvits and Maarja Kangro to write an operetta  (My Swans, My Thoughts). The libretto premiered in 2006 and was performed at the Von Krahl Theatre in Tallinn and subsequently was performed at the Tallinn City Theatre.

Works
1906:  (poetry)
1910:  Elukevade (short stories)
1913: Luule (poetry)
1988: Käisin üksi tähte valgel (selected poetry)

References

1890 births
1942 deaths
People from Antsla Parish
People from Kreis Werro
20th-century Estonian poets
Estonian women poets
20th-century women writers
Burials at Liiva Cemetery